Bryants Corner is a community in Weldford Parish, New Brunswick, Canada. Located 3.83 km E of Harcourt, it is named for James Bryant, Jabez Bryant, William Bryant Jr. and Annie Bryant who were early settlers bringing the Open Plymouth Brethren religion to the community with the formation of the Emerson Road Gospel Hall with attached cemetery.  The community is located on Route 116.

History

There was a Post Office from 1912–1964 and it included Colebrookdale, a former name for the community of Coal Branch.

Notable people

See also
List of communities in New Brunswick

Settlements in New Brunswick
Communities in Kent County, New Brunswick